Joseph Timothy Thomerson (born April 8, 1946) is an American actor and comedian. He is best known for his role as Jack Deth in the Trancers film series and for his work in numerous low-budget features and for his comedic television roles, as well as appearing in mainstream films such as Uncommon Valor, Air America, Volunteers, Who's Harry Crumb?, Iron Eagle, and Fear and Loathing in Las Vegas..

Early life

Tim Thomerson was born in Coronado, California. He was brought up in both Hawaii and in San Diego. Following a stint in the Army National Guard, where he served as a cook in a tank company with actor Brion James, Thomerson chose to become an actor, while taking a job as a set builder and prop man at San Diego's Old Globe Theatre, famous for its Shakespearean productions.

Following college, Thomerson began a career as a stand-up comedian, honing his skills. He appeared in comedy clubs that included The Bitter End in Greenwich Village, The Improv in Los Angeles, and Catch a Rising Star in New York City.

Career

Initial success
Thomerson entered the world of stand-up comedy in the 1970s. In Los Angeles, he became a regular at the Comedy Store and the Improv, as well as making numerous appearances on television variety shows and in Las Vegas.

One of Thomerson's early acting breaks came from director Robert Altman who, after seeing Thomerson's stand-up act, cast him in the film A Wedding. Thomerson first came to prominence in the short-lived comedy science-fiction TV series Quark in 1977–78, as Gene/Jean, a character of dual gender who randomly switched between the two.

Feature film actor
Thomerson began a long career in television and film starting in the mid-1970s, starting with roles such as the criminal psychologist Jerry Moriarity in the slasher film Fade to Black (1980) before moving on to starring roles such as the time-traveling future cop Jack Deth in the 1985 low-budget science-fiction film Trancers, his most famous role.

In 1986, Thomerson reunited with a few of his Trancers co-stars for the World War II science fiction film Zone Troopers; he also appeared in the vampire film Near Dark, and played a villain opposite Melanie Griffith's heroine in the science fiction film Cherry 2000. He also appeared in NBC's television film The Incredible Hulk Returns (1988) as the Hulk's opponent, Jack LeBeau.

When Charles Band started Full Moon Features in the late 1980s, one of his first projects was the sequel Trancers II (1991), in which he reunited Thomerson with much of the cast from the first film. Thomerson would later appear in each of the sequels except Trancers 6.

In the 1990s, he was a series regular on the TV police drama Sirens, followed by a regular, co-starring role on the series Land's End.

Filmography

Video games

References

External links

1946 births
Living people
20th-century American male actors
21st-century American male actors
Male actors from California
American male television actors
American male film actors
People from Coronado, California
Male actors from San Diego
20th-century American comedians
21st-century American comedians
Comedians from California
California National Guard personnel
United States Army soldiers